Bryski may refer to:

Bryski, Łódź Voivodeship, a village in the administrative district of Gmina Góra Świętej Małgorzaty, Poland
Bryski, Masovian Voivodeship, a village in the administrative district of Gmina Rościszewo, Poland